Walnut Creek (also called Walnut Branch) is a tributary of Flat Creek in the U.S. state of Missouri, in Pettis County.

Walnut Creek was so named due to the walnut trees near its course.

See also
List of rivers of Missouri

References

Rivers of Pettis County, Missouri
Rivers of Missouri